is a Japanese manga artist from Fukuyama City, Hiroshima Prefecture. He has published his works primarily in Shogakukan's manga magazine, Weekly Shōnen Sunday.

He is best known for his long-running baseball manga Major for which he won the Shogakukan Manga Award in 1996 in the shōnen category.

Mitsuda debuted in 1982, winning the Shogakukan Newcomers Award for "Banyū".

Works

Other works
 
  (1987)

References

External links 
Takuya Mitsuda at Websunday.net 

1965 births
Living people
Manga artists from Hiroshima Prefecture
People from Fukuyama, Hiroshima